The 2019 FINA Marathon Swim World Series took place from 16 February to 29 September 2019. It was the 13th edition of the FINA-sanctioned series, and included nine events.

Calendar

The calendar for the 2019 series, announced by FINA.

Medal summary

Men

Women

Medal table

References

External links

Official website 

FINA Marathon Swim World Series
FINA Marathon Swim World Series